The Liberal Democratic Party (PLD) was a minor liberal–centrist political party in Portugal. It never had representatives in the Assembly of the Republic, the Portuguese legislature. 

It was founded in September 2007, in Lisbon by college professor Eduardo Correia as the Merit and Society Movement (abbreviated MMS). On April 29, 2008 8,400 signatures were presented to the Portuguese Constitutional Court to start the legal procedures for the formation of the party. It was recognized the same month. Since 2011, it has been called the Liberal Democratic Party. It was declared extinct by the Portuguese Constitutional Court in November 2019.

References

External links
Official website

2007 establishments in Portugal
2015 disestablishments in Portugal
Centrist parties in Portugal
Defunct liberal political parties
Defunct political parties in Portugal
Liberal parties in Portugal
Political parties disestablished in 2015
Political parties established in 2007